Kim Kuk-Bom (born 19 February 1995) is a North Korean footballer, having represented the national team from since 2017. He represented his country at the 2018 Asian Games.

References

1995 births
Living people
North Korean footballers
North Korea international footballers
Footballers at the 2018 Asian Games
Sportspeople from Pyongyang
Association football midfielders
Asian Games competitors for North Korea